Season four of So You Think You Can Dance Australia, the Australian version of the American reality dance-off series So You Think You Can Dance, was hosted by Carrie Bickmore with Paula Abdul, Shannon Holtzapffel, Jason Gilkison and Aaron Cash acting as the judges.

The season consisted of 13 episodes in total. Weeks 1-3 were audition episodes, producing the Top 20 dancers who went on to appear in the performance episodes from Week 4 onwards.

As of season four onwards, the weekly results show, a staple of the series in seasons 1-3, has been cut from the show format and that only one episode will air each week as of the fourth season.

Auditions
Auditions for the fourth season were held between September and October 2013 in Perth, Brisbane, Melbourne, Adelaide and Sydney.

Top 20 Finalists

Female contestants

Male contestants

Results table

Performance Shows

Week 4: Top 20 (23 February 2014)

Week 5: Top 20 (2 March 2014)
 Group Dance: "Radioactive" – Imagine Dragons feat. Kendrick Lamar (Hip hop; Choreographer: Christopher Scott)

Solos
 Kathaleen Fisher: "Dance Again"— Jennifer Lopez feat. Pitbull
 Nadiah Idris:  "Waka Waka (This Time For Africa)" — Shakira
 Zoey Black: "Love Will Never Do (Without You)" — Janet Jackson
 Stephen Perez: "Are You Gonna Go My Way"— Lenny Kravitz
 Thabang Baloyi: "Runaway"— Bruno Mars
 Joel Rasmussen: "Get Ur Freak On"— Missy Elliott
 Eliminated
 Kathaleen Fisher
 Thabang Baloyi
 New Partners
 Maddie Peat & Chris Tsattalios

Week 6: Top 18 (9 March 2014)
 Group Dance: "Blurred Lines" – Robin Thicke feat. T.I. and Pharrell Williams (Hip-hop; Choreographer: Parris Goebel) (performed with Shannon Holtzapffel)
 Musical Guest: Rudimental – "Free"

Solos
 Sally Hare: "Pon de Floor" — Major Lazer feat. VYBZ Kartel
 Renelle Jones: "The Lady Is A Tramp" — Tony Bennett feat. Lady Gaga
 Yukino "Kino" McHugh: "Aqueous Transmission" — Incubus
 Chris Tsattalios: "If I Had You" — Adam Lambert
 Joel Rasmussen: "Touch It" — Busta Rhymes
 Youngkwang "Blond" Joung:  "Beats to the Rhyme" — Run DMC
 Eliminated
 Sally Hare
 Joel Rasmussen
 New Partners
 Renelle Jones & Jordan Turner

Week 7: Top 16 (20 March 2014)
Guest Tina Arena - Reset All

Immediately Saved
 Zoey Black
Solos
 Yukino "Kino" McHugh: "Please Don't Go" — Mike Posner
 Nadiah Idris: "Work" — Ciara feat. Missy Elliott
 Jordan Turner: "What You Wanted" — OneRepublic
 Patric Kuo: "Pop" — *NSYNC
 Michael Dameski: "Fall Dubstep Mix" — DJ X-5IGHT
 Eliminated
 Nadiah Idris
 Jordan Turner
 New Partners
 Renelle Jones & Michael Dameski

Week 8: Top 14 (27 March 2014)

Solos
 Maddie Peat: "Eyes On Fire" - Blue Foundation
 Yukino McHugh: "Brotsjór" - Ólafur Arnalds
 Renelle Jones: "Hopeless Wonderer" - Mumford & Sons
 Youngkwang "Blond" Joung: "Gonna Make You Sweat (Everybody Dance Now)" - C+C Music Factory
 Chris Tsattalios: "Be My Lover" - INNA
 Jay Johns: "Let's Go" - Travis Barker (feat. Yelawolf, Twista, Busta Rhymes & Lil Jon)
 Eliminated
 Yukino McHugh
 Chris Tsattalios
 New Partners 
 Zoey Black & Lauren Seymour
 Maddie Peat & Ashleigh Tavares
 Eden Petrovski & Renelle Jones
 Youngkwang "Blond" Joung & Michael Dameski
 Patric Kuo & Jay Jones
 Stephen Perez & Sam Malseed

Week 9: Top 12 (3 April 2014)
Theme: Same Gender - The contestants will be dancing routines with a partner of the same gender.

Solos
 Renelle Jones: 
 Maddie Peat: "Fix You" - Coldplay
 Lauren Seymour: 
 Patric Kuo: 
 Youngkwang "Blond" Joung:
 Stephen Perez:
 Eliminated
 Maddie Peat
 Stephen Perez
Next Week's Partners
Patric Kuo & Ashleigh Tavaras
Youngkwang "Blond" Joung & Lauren Seymour
Jay Johns & Zoey Black
Sam Malseed & Eden Petrovski
Michael Dameski & Renelle Jones

Week 10: Top 10 (10 April 2014)

Solos
 Zoey Black:
 Ashleigh Tavares:
 Patric Kuo: 
 Michael Dameski:
 Eliminated
 Zoey Black
 Patric Kuo

Week 11: Top 8 (17 April 2014)

 Eliminated
 Eden Petrovski
 Youngkwang "Blond" Joung

Week 12 Semi Final: Top 6 (24 April 2014)

 Solos
Lauren Seymour: "Mama Do (Uh Oh, Uh Oh)" — Pixie Lott (Contemporary)
Ashleigh Tavares: "Feeling Good" — Jennifer Hudson (Contemporary)
Renelle Jones: "Crazy In Love" — Emile Sandé feat. The Bryan Ferry Orchestra (Jazz)
Sam Malseed: "When I Was Your Man" — Bruno Mars (Contemporary)
Jay Johns: "Hey Pachuco!" — Royal Crown Revue (Tap)
Michael Dameski: "Unstoppable!" — E.S. Posthumus (Contemporary)
 Eliminated
 Ashleigh Tavares
 Sam Malseed

Week 13 Grand Final: Top 4 (1 May 2014)
 Musical Guests: Jason Derulo featuring Snoop Dogg – "Wiggle" / Sam Smith – "Stay with Me" / Ed Sheeran - Sing

4th Place:
Renelle Jones
3rd Place
Jay Johns
Runner-Up:
Lauren Seymour
Winner:
Michael Dameski

Notes
The ranking of each gender was revealed this week.
On this occasion, the judges voiced indecision on the contestants to be eliminated and ultimately opted to determine the eliminated dancers directly according to the at-home viewer votes.
For Top 12 week, the dancers will be dancing in same-sex partnerships.
For this week, Malseed & Seymour performed to an on-stage piano accompaniment rather than the original song.
On this occasion, the Top 20 performed with Dameski & Seymour for a final dance number before announcing the winner.

External links
 

2014 Australian television seasons
Season 04